John W. Watson Sr. (October 31, 1859 - February 8, 1942) was an American politician who served in a number of elected positions throughout his career in Florida.

Biography 
Watson was born in South Carolina, moving to Florida in 1882.  He was Speaker of the Florida House of Representatives
 and held other elected offices before becoming the City of Miami's 6th and 8th Mayor.
He owned a grocery store, hardware company and grapefruit grove among his multiple business endeavors.

He built several buildings in Miami which became important to the city's growth and long-term development.
The Watson family is considered to be among Miami's first settlers as they arrived before the railroad to town was complete.

Watson ran for Florida Governor unsuccessfully in 1911-1912.

 Watson Island  is named after him.

Fraternal and Civic Affiliations
Fraternally he was connected with the Masonic order, the Knights of Pythias, and the Elks.

See also 

 List of mayors of Miami
 Government of Miami
 History of Miami

References
Notes
  

Bibliography  

 Hon. John W. Watson. Miami Herald, vol. 2, no. 110, 19 Mar. 1912, p. Page Three.
 John W. Watson, Nominated Mayor I First Primary - Miami Herald, July 23, 1913, Page One.

External links 

  The Magic City Miami History
 

Mayors of Miami
Speakers of the Florida House of Representatives
Members of the Florida House of Representatives
Lists of Florida politicians

1859 births
1942 deaths